Bà Nà Hill Station (or Bà Nà Hills) is a hill station and resort located in the Trường Sơn Mountains west of the city of Da Nang, in central Vietnam. The station, advertised as "the Da Lat of Danang province" by local tourism authorities, was founded in 1919 by French colonists. The colonists had built a resort to be used as a leisure destination for French tourists. Being located 1500 metres above sea level, it has a view of the East Sea and the surrounding mountains. 

Due to the elevation of the resort, the temperature is cooler than the environment near the coast. Linh Ung Pagoda is situated near the station, with a cable car nearby to carry tourists to and from the resort.

Ba Na Cable Car

Its latest tourist attraction is the Golden Bridge (Cầu Vàng).

in 2021 Ba Na Hills added their 6th Cable Car to the park, made by Doppelmayr and managed by Sun World, Sun Group.

References

External links
 

Buildings and structures in Da Nang
Hill stations in Vietnam
Tourist attractions in Da Nang